The 2nd constituency of Nord is a French legislative constituency in the Nord département.

Description

Nord's 2nd constituency covers the eastern portion of Lille including the suburbs of Villeneuve-d'Ascq, Lezennes and Ronchin.

Politically the seat was a bastion of the Socialist Party until 2017 and was for many years held by former President of the Nord General Council Bernard Derosier. It is also notable for being held for many years by Pierre Mauroy, the Prime Minister of France between 1981 and 1984, Mauroy was also the Mayor of Lille for 28 years.

Historic Representation

Election results

2022

 
 
 
 
 
 
 
|-
| colspan="8" bgcolor="#E9E9E9"|
|-

2017

2012

 
 
 
 
 
 
|-
| colspan="8" bgcolor="#E9E9E9"|
|-

2007

 
 
 
 
 
 
 
|-
| colspan="8" bgcolor="#E9E9E9"|
|-

2002

 
 
 
 
 
 
 
|-
| colspan="8" bgcolor="#E9E9E9"|
|-

1997

 
 
 
 
 
 
 
|-
| colspan="8" bgcolor="#E9E9E9"|
|-

Sources

 Official results of French elections from 2002: "Résultats électoraux officiels en France" (in French).

2